Eau de Cologne mint, also known as orange mint and bergamot mint, is a cultivated mint. In a 1970 study, most plants were found to be male sterile forms of Mentha aquatica, so were regarded as Mentha aquatica var. citrata, although in England the hybrid Mentha × piperita was found. The Royal Horticultural Society treats eau de Cologne mint as Mentha × piperita f. citrata. The World Checklist of Selected Plant Families sinks both scientific names into Mentha aquatica.

Description
Eau de Cologne mint has a strong odor due to the two chemical constituents, linalyl acetate (45%) and linalool (45-50%), which make up around 90% of the oil. Kiran, a high-yielding variety, produces 150 kg of oil/ha while keeping 45% of linalool. It is grown mainly in subtropical, fertile land such as northern India. The oil is mainly used in the perfumery industry.

Traditional medicinal uses
A tea made from the fresh or dried leaves of the plant has traditionally been used to treat stomach aches, nausea, parasites and nerves.

References

Mentha